Peshkovskaya is a rural locality (a village) in Zhityovskoye Rural Settlement, Syamzhensky District, Vologda Oblast, Russia. The population was 28 as of 2002.

Geography 
Peshkovskaya is located 12 km southeast of Syamzha (the district's administrative centre) by road. Yakovlevskaya is the nearest rural locality.

In 1965 a memorial obelisk was erected in Pashkovskaya to remember the night witch Polina Makogon and other pilots.

References 

Rural localities in Syamzhensky District